Associations Incorporation Act 1981 (Victoria) is the act of the Parliament of Victoria in Australia to make provision for the incorporation of certain associations, for the regulation of these incorporated associations.

It was assented to on 5 January 1982 and came into operation on 1 July 1983 after being printed in the Government Gazette on 25 May 1983 (p. 1238).

Among other changes, it amended the Evidence Act 1958. Consumer Affairs Victoria administers this legislation.

Purpose 
The aim of the act is to provide a way for the:
 registration and incorporation of associations 
 regulation, accountability and governance of associations

External links 

 Legislation Administered by Consumer Affairs Victoria
 Parliamentary information on bill
 Legislation on AustLII

References  

Victoria (Australia) legislation
1981 in Australian law
1980s in Victoria (Australia)